A Wedding in the Dream is a 1948 Chinese Peking opera film directed by Fei Mu and generally considered China's first color film. It starred and was co-written by Mei Lanfang, one of the century's best-known Chinese opera singers. The film is also known as Happiness Neither in Life Nor in Death and Remorse at Death.

Notes

References  
 Zhang, Yingjin. Chinese National Cinema. Routledge, 2004. .

External links 
 

Chinese musical films
1948 films
Films directed by Fei Mu
Peking opera films
Films set in 12th-century Song dynasty
1940s Mandarin-language films